Heronswood may refer to:

 Heronswood (botanical garden), a botanical garden in Washington, USA
 Heronswood, Victoria, a historic house in Victoria, Australia